Pleasant Mount Cumberland Presbyterian Church is a Cumberland Presbyterian church in Columbia, Tennessee.

The church building was constructed in 1899 and added to the National Register of Historic Places in 1977.

References

External links
 

Presbyterian churches in Tennessee
Churches on the National Register of Historic Places in Tennessee
Gothic Revival church buildings in Tennessee
Churches completed in 1899
19th-century Presbyterian church buildings in the United States
Churches in Maury County, Tennessee
Cumberland Presbyterian Church
Buildings and structures in Columbia, Tennessee
National Register of Historic Places in Maury County, Tennessee